Sefaira is a software company specializing in cloud-based software for energy-efficient building design. In 2011, Sefaira won the Green Building Innovation of the Year award at London’s Ecobuild. The company was founded in 2009.

On February 8, 2016, Trimble Inc. announced the acquisition of Sefaira Ltd. Sefaira will join SketchUp in the Trimble Architecture & Design division, part of Trimble Buildings.

History
Sefaira was founded in 2009 by Peter Krebs and Mads Jensen to provide the building industry with software to design and create buildings. Co-Founder and CEO Mads Jensen said in an interview, “we set out to create a new type of web-based design tool that would allow green buildings to become the norm.”

The founders derived the name Sefaira from the Greek word Sfera or sphere, symbolizing the earth and the company’s holistic approach to building-energy conservation.

In 2009, Sefaira won the INSEAD Business Venture Competition, and shortly after Sefaira was incorporated in London, UK, with offices opening in New York, US, shortly thereafter.

In 2011, Sefaira cloud based analysis platform was voted the most promising new technology at the London Ecobuild.

In April 2012, the company announced that it had received $10.8 million in Series A funding from Braemar Energy Ventures in partnership with Amsterdam-based Chrysalix SET and UK-based Hermes GPE., and in July 2012, the company announced the public launch of the Sefaira web application.

In 2013 and 2014, Sefaira won several awards and accolades, including being listed as part of the Global Cleantech 100 - the top 100 cleantech companies judged most likely to make a significant market impact over the next 5–10 years according to the Cleantech Group.

Products
The company’s primary product is Sefaira, a web-based performance analysis platform specifically built for conceptual design. Sefaira is targeted towards architects, engineers, consultants and building designers. It performs whole-building physics-based analysis of water, carbon and renewable energy potential allowing designers and architects to explore design options. The software includes support for SketchUp. In 2013, Sefaira released a new plugin for SketchUp that connects energy analysis and daylight to building design. In 2014, Sefaira released a new plugin for Autodesk Revit that connects energy analysis and daylight to building design. In 2015, Sefaira released Sefaira Systems, a product designed for HVAC designers to do system sizing and energy analysis using SketchUp and Revit models.
In 2020, Trimble released SketchUp Studio 2020, whose file format can be used by Sefaira.

Awards
 2009 – INSEAD Business Venture Competition – Winner 
 2011 – Green Building Innovation of the Year – Winner
 2012 – Going Green - Global Top 200 Private Companies
 2013 – Red Herring 2013 Top 100 Global
 2013 – Sustainability Leaders Award – 2013 Winner for best Software Innovation  
 2013 & 2014 – Global Cleantech 100 award
 2014 – Architizer A+ Awards – Best App – Jury's Winner
 2015 – Edison Awards – Bronze – for Energy Management/Conservation Category
 2015 – Dutch Green Building Council – Duurzaame Innovation (Sustainability Innovation) Winner
 2015 – Sefaira is named in the 2015 Global Cleantech 100 for a third year in a row
 2019 – The PBD Performance Based Design approach using Sefaira and SketchUp featured in Design Process chapter of MEEB 13th Edition (Mechanical and Electrical Equipment for Buildings)
 2020 – Sefaira+SketchUp design wins ICF Magazine Small Residence project of the year award
 2022 – Project Stasio: Winter 2022 Challenge-Simple Box Modeling Overall Winner

References

Software companies established in 2009
Computer companies established in 2009
British companies established in 2009
Computer companies of the United Kingdom
Software companies of the United Kingdom